Yamile Azenek Franco Tirado (born 7 July 1992), is a Mexican professional football midfielder who currently plays for Monterrey of the Liga MX Femenil.

She played for Mexico in a 2017 friendly against Sweden.

References

External links
 
 
 

1992 births
Living people
Footballers from Mexico City
Mexican women's footballers
Women's association football midfielders
C.F. Pachuca (women) footballers
Liga MX Femenil players
Mexico women's international footballers
Mexican footballers